Robison may refer to:

 Robison (name), a surname; includes a list of people with the name
 Robison Field, a former Major League Baseball park in St. Louis, Missouri, U.S.
 Robison Glacier, Antarctica
 Robison Peak, Antarctica

See also
 Robeson (disambiguation)
 Robinson (disambiguation)